Poul Mejer (2 November 1931 – 9 January 2000) was a Danish footballer who played as a winger.

Career
Mejer played his entire career for Vejle Boldklub, where he got 307 caps for the club's first team. He was known for his fantastic pace, which was his primary weapon. From his wing position he scored many goals for his teammates.

Mejer experienced two league promotions with Vejle Boldklub in 1952 and 1956. In 1958 he was part in one of the biggest triumphs in the history of Vejle Boldklub as the club won The Double. Heplayed a major role in the Cup final as he scored the winner against rivals AGF. The triumph was followed up in the 1959 season as Vejle went on to win the Danish title once again.

Mejer was also part of the Denmark national team's squad at the 1960 Summer Olympics, but he did not play in any matches.

Mejer played his last match for Vejle Boldklub in April 1966.

References

External links
 
 
 

1931 births
2000 deaths
People from Vejle Municipality
Danish men's footballers
Association football wingers
Denmark international footballers
Footballers at the 1960 Summer Olympics
Olympic footballers of Denmark
Olympic silver medalists for Denmark
Olympic medalists in football
Vejle Boldklub players
Medalists at the 1960 Summer Olympics
Sportspeople from the Region of Southern Denmark